Karanac is a settlement in the region of Baranja, Croatia. Administratively, it is located in the Kneževi Vinogradi municipality within the Osijek-Baranja County. Population is 1,065 people.

Ethnic groups (2001 census)
Croats = 429
Serbs = 341
Hungarians = 219
others = 76

See also
Osijek-Baranja county
Baranja
Church of St. Stefan Štiljanović, Karanac

References 

Kneževi Vinogradi